The 1988 Miami Dolphins season was the team's 23rd as a member of the National Football League (NFL). The Dolphins failed to improve upon their previous season's output of 8–7, winning only six games and failing to reach the playoffs for the third straight season.

Even without future Pro Football Hall of Fame center Dwight Stephenson, who was forced to retire prior to this season due to injuries, the Dolphins offensive line set the record for fewest sacks in a single season with 7 during 1988, protecting quarterback Dan Marino. Marino was only sacked on 0.98% of his dropbacks in 1988, also a single-season NFL record.

This would be the last time Don Shula recorded a losing record during his tenure as Dolphins coach, and in his coaching career overall. It would be the final losing season for the Dolphins for 15 years.

Personnel

Staff

Roster

Regular season

Schedule 

Note: Intra-division opponents are in bold text.

Game summaries

Week 5 

First time Dan Marino faced the Minnesota Vikings in the regular season.

Week 6

Standings

Awards and records 
 October 23, 1988: Dan Marino set a franchise record for most passing yards in one game (521)
 November 6, 1988: Jim Jensen set a franchise record for most receptions in one game (12) 
 Brian Sochia, Pro Bowl selection

References

External links 
 1988 Miami Dolphins at Pro-Football-Reference.com

Miami Dolphins seasons
Miami Dolphins
Miami Dolphins